Ahmed Al Meghessib (Arabic:أحمد المغيصيب; born 28 June 1998) is a Qatari footballer who plays as an attacking midfielder, most recently for Umm Salal.

Career

Lekhwiya
Al Meghessib started his career at Lekhwiya and is a product of the Aspire Academy's youth system.

Qatar SC
On 9 August 2017, he left Lekhwiya and signed with Qatar SC. On 15 October 2017, Al Meghessib made his professional debut for Qatar SC against Al-Sadd in the Pro League, replacing Omar Al-Amadi .

Al-Duhail
In 2018 he left Qatar SC and signed with Al-Duhail. On 13 November 2018, Al Meghessib participated in PSG B exercises in a one-week experiment .

Umm Salal
On 17 July 2019, he left Al-Duhail and signed with Umm Salal. On 20 September 2019, Al Meghessib made his professional debut for Umm Salal against Al-Sadd in the Pro League, replacing Jasser Yahya .

External links

References

Living people
1998 births
Qatari footballers
Lekhwiya SC players
Aspire Academy (Qatar) players
Qatar SC players
Al-Duhail SC players
Umm Salal SC players
Al Ahli SC (Doha) players
Qatar Stars League players
Association football midfielders
Place of birth missing (living people)